The Gilburt was an English automobile manufactured from 1904 to 1905 in Kilburn, London.  It was a two or three seater light car with a 6 hp twin-cylinder engine from Fafnir and used a tubular chassis and chain drive.

See also
 List of car manufacturers of the United Kingdom

References
David Burgess Wise, The New Illustrated Encyclopedia of Automobiles

Defunct motor vehicle manufacturers of England
Motor vehicle manufacturers based in London